Written Language and Literacy is a peer-reviewed biannual academic journal of linguistics published by John Benjamins Publishing Company. The editor-in-chief is Beatrice Primus (University of Cologne). It is abstracted and indexed by European Reference Index for the Humanities, Linguistic Bibliography/Bibliographie Linguistique, MLA Bibliography, and Scopus. The journal was established in 1998.

External links

 

Linguistics journals
English-language journals
Biannual journals
Publications established in 1998
John Benjamins academic journals